Alice in Wonderland is a 1985 American two-part made-for-television adventure family fantasy musical film of Lewis Carroll's books Alice's Adventures in Wonderland (1865) and Through the Looking-Glass (1871). An Irwin Allen production, it used a huge all-star cast of notable actors and actresses. The title role was played by Natalie Gregory, who wore a blonde wig for this miniseries. Alice in Wonderland was first telecast December 9, 1985, (part one) and December 10, 1985 (part two), at 8:00pm EST on CBS.

It was filmed in Los Angeles at the MGM Studios (now known as Sony Pictures Studios) in Culver City over a 55-day period from March 12, 1985, to May 28 of that same year. Additional filming took place at Malibu Beach for the oysters scene, and establishing shots of Alice's house took place at the S. S. Hinds Estate, also in the Los Angeles area.

Plot

Part 1 – Alice in Wonderland
After helping her mother set the table for tea time, Alice goes outside to see her sister and play with her kitten, Dinah. The White Rabbit comes running by, saying he's late. Wondering where he is going, Alice follows him and tumbles into his hole.

Alice finds herself in a hall with many doors, all of them locked. On a table is a key which she can use to open one small door. A small bottle appears labeled "Drink Me." By drinking from the bottle, she shrinks to the right size for the door, but can no longer reach the key to open it. She then eats a little cake, which makes her grow to over nine feet tall. Frustrated, Alice begins to cry. The White Rabbit appears, but frightened of the giant Alice, runs away, dropping his fan and gloves. Using the fan makes Alice shrink again, which takes her diving in her pool of tears, where she meets The Lory Bird, The Dodo Bird and the Mouse, who tells her why he hates dogs and cats ("I Hate Dogs and Cats").

The White Rabbit mistakes Alice for his housemaid Mary Ann and orders her to go get his fan and gloves from his house. While searching his house, Alice finds another "Drink Me" bottle, which makes her grow to nine feet tall once again. Angry at Alice, the rabbit and his butler Pat the Guinea Pig begin throwing berries at her, which turn into little cakes. She eats one and shrinks to back to size. After running away, she meets the Caterpillar who tells her the story "You are Old, Father William". She then meets The Duchess and her cook; the Cheshire Cat, who tells her "There's No Way Home"; and the Mad Hatter, March Hare, and Dormouse having an outdoor tea party ("Laugh"). Alice runs off back on her quest for the White Rabbit, and meets a baby fawn in the forest, the only normal thing she's seen so far ("Why Do People Act as If They're Crazy?").

Alice stumbles upon a doorway that leads to the rose garden of the Queen of Hearts, who always yells "Off with her Head!" She leaves to visit the Gryphon and Mock Turtle ("Nonsense"), but then she is called to attend the trial of the Knave of Hearts, who is accused of having stolen The Queen's tarts. Alice stands up to the Queen and is forced to flee the court. She trips and falls and finds herself back home.

Alice runs inside, only to discover herself trapped on the other side of the mirror. She notices a large book next to her and starts reading a poem called Jabberwocky about a scary monster. The lights go out, and the Jabberwock appears in the house.

Part 2 – Through the Looking-Glass
The Jabberwock disappears as Alice hides behind the chessboard, knocking it over. As she places the pieces back on the table, she realizes they are all alive, but can't hear her. Desperate for a clue, Alice looks around the room and sees a painting of an Owl, which comes to life and explains that the Jabberwock is a creation of Alice's own childish fears, which she must overcome in order to return to the real world.

Alice has an interesting conversation with some talking flowers and meets The Red Queen from the chess set, now human-sized. The Red Queen tells Alice that she is now a pawn in a giant game of chess. Once Alice reaches the eighth square to become a queen, she can go home. She boards a train to the fourth square, where she meets Tweedledum and Tweedledee, who teach her the proper way to "Shake Hands" and sing the story of "The Walrus and the Carpenter". She meets The White Queen ("Jam Tomorrow, Jam Yesterday") and Humpty Dumpty. The Jabberwock appears again and knocks Humpty Dumpty off of his wall.

Alice meets The White King and his messenger, who bring Alice to see "The Lion and the Unicorn" as they fight for the crown. The Lion and the Unicorn call a temporary truce and Alice hands out a tray of Looking-Glass Cake, which must be passed around first, then cut after. She is captured by the Red Knight and rescued by the White Knight, who sings and dances her all the way to the eighth square ("We are Dancing"). She meets up with the Red Queen and White Queen, who have a few "Queenly" tests ("Can You do Addition") and some words of wisdom for her ("Emotions"). The White Queen falls asleep on Alice's lap and the Red Queen sings her a lullaby ("Hush-a-bye Lady"). Alice finds her way to her castle, where a great feast has been set in her honor ("To the Looking-Glass World").

A present is brought to her, out of which comes The Jabberwock. The Owl tells her to act brave. Alice finds her way back to the mirror and into her home, where she confronts The Jabberwock, telling him that he is just in her imagination and that she does not believe in him. In a billow of smoke and lightning, the Jabberwock disappears. Alice slumps into a chair and is woken up by her Mother calling Alice to tea. When Alice heads upstairs to change for tea, she sees her Wonderland family in the mirror, and they sing farewell to her ("Alice").

Cast
In order of appearance.

Part 1 – Alice in Wonderland 
 Natalie Gregory as Alice
 Sheila Allen as Mother
 Sharee Gregory as Sister
 Red Buttons as The White Rabbit
 Sherman Hemsley as The Mouse
 Donald O'Connor as The Lory Bird
 Charles Dougherty as The Duck
 Shelley Winters as The Dodo Bird
 Billy Braver as The Eaglet
 Scott Baio as Pat the Pig
 Ernie F. Orsatti as Bill the Lizard
 Sammy Davis Jr. as The Caterpillar/Father William
 Scotch Byerley as Fish Footman
 Robert Axelrod as Frog Footman
 Martha Raye as The Duchess
 Imogene Coca as The Cook
 Telly Savalas as The Cheshire Cat
 Anthony Newley as The Mad Hatter
 Roddy McDowall as The March Hare
 Arte Johnson as The Dormouse
 Lana Beeson as Alice (singing) (uncredited)
 Michael Chieffo as Two of Spades
 Jeffrey Winner as Five of Spades
 John Walter Davis as Seven of Spades
 Jayne Meadows as The Queen of Hearts
 Robert Morley as The King of Hearts
 James Joseph Galante as Knave of Hearts
 Selma Archerd as The Queen of Diamonds
 George Savalas as The Courtier
 Candance Savalas as The Lady in Waiting
 Sid Caesar as The Gryphon
 Ringo Starr as The Mock Turtle
 Troy Jordan as The Black Cat
 Tom McLoughlin as Jabberwocky

Part 2 – Through The Looking-Glass 
 Tom McLoughlin as Jabberwocky
 Natalie Gregory as Alice
 Ann Jillian as Red Queen
 Patrick Culliton as Red King
 Carol Channing as White Queen
 Harvey Korman as White King
 Jack Warden as The Owl
 Sally Struthers as The Tiger Lily
 Donna Mills as The Rose
 Laura Carlson as The Daisy
 Merv Griffin as The Conductor
 Patrick Duffy as The Goat
 Steve Allen as The Gentleman in Paper Suit
 Pat Morita as The Horse
 George Gobel as The Gnat
 Eydie Gormé as Tweedle Dee
 Steve Lawrence as Tweedle Dum
 Karl Malden as The Walrus
 Louis Nye as The Carpenter
 Kristi Lynes as Oyster #1
 Desiree Sbazo as Oyster #2
 Barbie Alison as Oyster #3
 Janie Walton as Oyster #4
 Jonathan Winters as Humpty Dumpty
 Tom McLoughlin as Jabberwocky
 John Stamos as The Messenger
 Ernest Borgnine as The Lion
 Beau Bridges as The Unicorn
 Dee Brantlinger as The Lady of the Court
 Don Matheson as The Red Knight
 Lloyd Bridges as The White Knight
 Red Buttons as The White Rabbit
 Jayne Meadows as The Queen of Hearts
 Robert Morley as The King of Hearts
 James Joseph Galante as Knave of Hearts
 Anthony Newley as The Mad Hatter
 Roddy McDowall as The March Hare
 Arte Johnson as The Dormouse
 Sheila Allen as Mother

Musical numbers
(All Musical Numbers composed by Steve Allen)

Part 1 – Alice in Wonderland 
"I Hate Dogs and Cats" – Sherman Hemsley
"You Are Old, Father William" – Sammy Davis Jr.
"There's Something To Say For Hatred" – Martha Raye & Imogene Coca
"There's No Way Home" – Telly Savalas
"Laugh" – Anthony Newley
"Why Do People…?" – Lana Beeson (Uncredited for Natalie Gregory)
"Off With Their Heads" – Jayne Meadows feat. Robert Morley
"Nonsense" –  Ringo Starr
"I Didn't; You Did!" – Anthony Newley and Roddy McDowall

Part 2 – Alice Through The Looking-Glass 
"How Do You Do, Shake Hands" – Eydie Gormé and Steve Lawrence
"The Walrus and the Carpenter" – Steve Lawrence, Eydie Gormé, Karl Malden, Louis Nye and the Oysters
"Jam Tomorrow" – Carol Channing
"The Lion and the Unicorn" – Harvey Korman, John Stamos, and Natalie Gregory
"We Are Dancing" – Lloyd Bridges and Natalie Gregory
"Can You Do Addition?" – Ann Jillian and Carol Channing
"Emotions" – Ann Jillian
"Hush-A-Bye Lady" –  Ann Jillian
"To The Looking-Glass World" –  Red Buttons, Lana Beeson, and Company
"Alice" – Company

Ratings
The miniseries was a modest success during its original airing. Out of 71 shows, part 1 ranked at 13, and came in at 21.2 points out of a 31-point share. Part 2 ranked at 35, and came in at 16.8 points out of a 25-point share. In total, the miniseries averaged 19 points out of a 28-point share. Part 1 won easily from 8-9 P.M. opposite Hardcastle and McCormick on ABC, and TV's Bloopers and Practical Jokes on NBC. From 9–9:30 p.m., part 1 was 0.6 points ahead of Monday Night Football on ABC.

In popular culture
The Jabberwocky and the White Knight suits went on to be reused as "The Reluctant Dragon" and "Sir Giles the Knight" in the 1986 musical TV film adaptation of Kenneth Grahame's The Reluctant Dragon, produced by Irwin Allen Productions, with Michael Sorich as the voice of the Dragon, and Lloyd Bridges as Sir Giles.

Home media
Warner Home Video first released the film on VHS in 1986. A 1993 release split the parts for individual sale, edited to eliminate the original cliffhanger: Part One ended with an onscreen quote from the final chapter of the first novel as Alice ran happily towards her home; Part Two, released as Alice Through the Looking Glass, began with the final minutes trimmed from the previous installment.

Sony Pictures Home Entertainment released the film on DVD in August 2006, restoring the original TV broadcast edit.

References

External links
Alice in Wonderland: Film and TV productions across the year 

American television films
1985 television films
1985 fantasy films
Films based on Alice in Wonderland
Films produced by Irwin Allen
Films based on multiple works of a series
Films shot in Los Angeles
1985 films
1980s English-language films